Holland is an unincorporated community in Josephine County, Oregon, United States. It is about eight miles southeast of Cave Junction, in the Illinois Valley south of Oregon Route 46.

Holland post office was established in 1899 and named for area pioneer James E. Holland. The office closed in 1960.

Holland is in the heart of the Josephine County gold mining district and is the home of the Holland Loop Store and Foris Vineyards Winery.

References

External links
Image of the Holland Store from Flickr
Oregon Caves History Loop Tour with details about Holland

Unincorporated communities in Josephine County, Oregon
1899 establishments in Oregon
Populated places established in 1899
Unincorporated communities in Oregon